Artem Olegovich Dolgopyat (born 16 June 1997) is a Ukrainian-born Israeli artistic gymnast. He is the 2020 Olympic champion on floor exercise. He also won two silver medals at the 2017 and 2019 World Championships on the floor exercise, and is the 2020 European champion of that exercise.

Dolgopyat is a floor exercise specialist and is noted for executing a triple back on that exercise. In 2022, he won the gold medal for his floor exercise at the European Gymnastics Championships in Tokyo

Biography
Artem Dolgopyat was born in Dnipropetrovsk (now Dnipro),  Ukraine. Dolgopyat's father Oleg is a former gymnast and is of Jewish descent, whereas Dolgopyat's mother Angela Bilan is not Jewish.

In 2009  at the age of 12, Dolgopyat immigrated with his family to Israel. He joined the gymnastics team of Maccabi Tel Aviv where he was trained by Israeli coach Sergey Vaisburg. His parents divorced in 2012. He attended the Shevah Mofet school in Tel Aviv, Israel, however he later dropped out of high school due to language difficulties and the burden of training.

He was enlisted as a soldier in the Israel Defense Forces, serving at Tel HaShomer base.

Athletic career
By the age of 12, prior to moving to Israel, Dolgopyat was already a two-time national champion in Ukraine for his age group.

At the age of 17, Dolgopyat competed in the 2014 Summer Youth Olympics and finished 5th in vault, 7th in floor exercise, and 10th in the individual all-around event.

On September 19, 2015, Dolgopyat competed in 'Grand Prix Osijek' in Croatia, and won the gold medal in floor exercise, scoring  14.800. Later that year, Dolgopyat won the floor exercise in the Israeli Championship for the first time, defeating Alexander Shatilov. At the end of 2016, he took three months off from the sport, due to back pain.

On April 22, 2017, Dolgopyat competed for his first time in the European Artistic Gymnastics Championships, and finished 4th in the floor exercise with a score of 14.33, one place behind bronze medalist Shatilov.

On May 20, Dolgopyat won the silver medal in 2017 Grand Prix Osijek after scoring 14.700. In July 2017, Dolgopyat participated in the 2017 Maccabiah Games, where he won two gold medals in the floor exercise and pommel horse, and a bronze medal in the vault.

At the 2017 Artistic Gymnastics World Championships held in Montreal, Dolgopyat won the silver medal in the floor exercise after scoring 14.533. He garnered the best Israeli result ever at the World Artistic Gymnastics Championships as he became the second Israeli gymnast to win a medal in the Championships (after his mentor and trainer Alex Shatilov, who won bronze medals in 2009 and 2011), and the first to win a silver medal. He scored 14.533 points (following a 14.666 in the qualifiers), finishing 1.1 points behind Japan's Olympic medalist Kenzo Shirai.

 At the 2018 European Championships held in Glasgow, Scotland, he won the silver medal on the floor exercise after scoring 14.466. That year, he also won a number of medals on floor; gold from World Challenge Cup Paris, gold from World Challenge Cup Szombathely, silver from World Challenge Cup Koper and silver from World Challenge Cup Osijek.

At the 2019 World Artistic Gymnastics Championships held in Stuttgart, Germany, Dolgopyat won the silver medal for the second time on floor exercise with a score of 15.200 behind Carlos Yulo of the Philippines, who scored a 15.300. Dolgopyat and Yulo were both awarded the same execution score of 8.800, but the latter had a higher difficulty score of 6.5 versus the former's 6.4, which had resulted in Yulo securing this win. That year, Dolgopyat also competed at the 2019 European Championships held in Szczecin, Poland and won the silver medal after scoring 14.900 in the final

At the 2020 European Championships held in Mersin, Turkey, He won two medals; gold on the floor exercise and bronze on the vault. Dolgopyat became the second Israeli gymnast to win a European gold. He qualified to the floor final from the second place with a score of 14.933 and finished first in the final after scoring 15.000. On the vault, Dolgopyat scored an average of 14.483 in the final and finished third.

2020 Summer Olympics
At the 2020 Summer Olympics in Tokyo, he won gold for Israel on the floor exercise. It was Israel's first Olympic medal in gymnastics, and second ever gold medal at the Olympics. Dolgopyat competed on the pommel horse and the floor exercise. He did not qualify to the pommel horse final after scoring 12.766 in qualifications. On the floor exercise, he qualified to the final in first place after scoring 15.200. On the floor exercise final, he scored 14.933, same as Rayderley Zapata from Spain, but finished first due to a higher difficulty score.

Achievements
Source:

See also
 List of select Jewish gymnasts
 Sports in Israel

References

External links

 
 
 
 
 
 Artem Dolgopyat video from the 2017 World Championships

1997 births
Living people
Israeli male artistic gymnasts
Medalists at the World Artistic Gymnastics Championships
Maccabiah Games medalists in gymnastics
Maccabiah Games gold medalists for Israel
Maccabiah Games bronze medalists for Israel
Competitors at the 2017 Maccabiah Games
Ukrainian emigrants to Israel
Gymnasts at the 2014 Summer Youth Olympics
Israeli people of Ukrainian descent
Israeli people of Ukrainian-Jewish descent
Israeli people of Soviet descent
Sportspeople from Dnipro
Sportspeople from Rishon LeZion
Sportspeople from Tel Aviv
European Games competitors for Israel
Gymnasts at the 2019 European Games
Olympic gymnasts of Israel
Gymnasts at the 2020 Summer Olympics
Medalists at the 2020 Summer Olympics
Olympic medalists in gymnastics
Olympic gold medalists for Israel
European champions in gymnastics